Piotr Szczechowicz (born 20 June 1976) is a Polish football manager. He has managed two teams in I liga.

References

1976 births
Living people
Polish football managers
Ząbkovia Ząbki managers
Wisła Płock managers
MKP Pogoń Siedlce managers
Polonia Warsaw managers
People from Pruszków